The Valparaíso Metro (formerly called "Merval") is the commuter rail system serving the urban conglomeration of Gran Valparaíso, Chile.

It is administered by Metro Regional de Valparaíso S.A., a subsidiary of the Chilean state-owned train company Empresa de los Ferrocarriles del Estado. The Valparaíso Metro began with the conversion of an interurban service on the Santiago–Valparaíso railway line into more rapid transit-like service in 2005 – the renovated line was inaugurated on November 23, 2005 and began service the following day. The Valparaíso Metro carried 19.66 million passengers in 2016.

Together with the much larger Santiago Metro, it is one of the only two underground urban rail systems in Chile (the Valparaíso Metro has a  underground stretch from Miramar through Chorrillos stations in Viña del Mar). However, it is not a full metro system due to the existence of various level crossings and the long distances between stations. As a result of the presence of at-grade level crossings and regional rail character, the Valparaíso Metro is more analogous to a commuter rail system.

Studies are being done to assess the feasibility of extending the line farther inland along the Valparaíso-Santiago Railway to serve the towns of Quillota, La Cruz, and La Calera which are currently being served by intercity buses (Bus+Metro services) that feed into Limache Station. In addition, passenger and freight service between Valparaíso and Santiago is proposed to use the line.

History 

Valparaíso had an interurban passenger train system since the 19th century. In 1999 construction began on the current system, rebuilding the old interurban stations and building new ones with a homologous design. New trains arrived in Chile on February 22, 2005 and the old system was decommissioned on June 30 that year, in favour of the new Valparaíso Metro service.

Architecture 

Between Puerto and Recreo the line runs at street level, bordering the coast, parallel to Errázuriz and España Avenues. It descends into the tunnel below Viana and Álvarez Avenues, with four underground stations. The line leaves the tunnel at the industrial area of El Salto and continues along a winding path to the inner metropolitan area.

Fleet and operations 
Valparaiso Metro has a fleet of 35 trains; 27 single-deck multiple-car X'Trapolis 100 train sets manufactured by Alstom, France operate the service, in a blue and white livery and 8 single-deck multiple-car X'Trapolis Modular train sets manufactured by Alstom, in Barcelona.

Services operate 06:30-22:30 on weekdays; 07:30-22.30 on Saturday, and 08:00-22:15 on Sunday and public holidays. Services between Puerto and Sargento Aldea are most frequent, at 6-minute frequencies, with 12-minute frequencies elsewhere, 12 minutes on weekends and public holidays.

Ticketing and fares 

To access the services of Metro Valparaiso the only means of payment is the Metroval card, a smart contactless card, costing CLP$1,350 (US$2.05) in May 2016 and sold at all stations. The card can be loaded in all ticket offices with cash or Redcompra; the minimum charge for general users is $300 and $1,000 to use Redcompra, all loads must be multiples of $100. It is scanned both entering and leaving stations since fares depend on the length of the journey and the time of day.  There are five Zones and three time-of-day fares. Tickets cost from CLP$410 (US$0.62) in low-usage hours within Zone 1 (T1) to CLP$864 (US$1.31) in rush-hour travelling through five zones, for example from Valparaíso to Limache. The service "Bus + Metro" in the Limache Station to the cities of Limache Viejo, Olmué, Quillota and La Calera cost between CLP$787(US$1.19) and CLP$1460 (US$2.22).

There are concession cards for students, senior citizens, disabled or handicapped people and tourists (This card allows unlimited travel on the day of acquisition and cost CLP$2.360 or US$3.58), Children below one metre in height travel for free.

Customer services and information offices are in 3 stations; Viña del Mar, Puerto and Limache.

See also 
 List of Valparaíso Metro stations
 Santiago–Valparaíso railway line
 Funicular railways of Valparaíso
 Trolleybuses in Valparaíso
 Transantiago

References

External links 

 Valparaíso Metro Official site 

Rapid transit in Chile
Rail transport in Chile
Metro
5 ft 6 in gauge railways in Chile
Transport in Valparaíso Region
Railway services introduced in 2005
2005 establishments in Chile